The Intel Extreme Masters (IEM) is a series of international esports tournaments held in countries around the world. These Electronic Sports League (ESL) sanctioned events, sponsored by Intel,  currently host events in Counter-Strike: Global Offensive and StarCraft II. Other game titles were hosted in the past. The body that owns the league is Turtle Entertainment. The League has operated 17 seasons . The season finals, with the largest prize pool, takes place in Katowice, Poland. Mid-season events are held in numerous cities around the globe, including Chicago, Shanghai and Sydney.

History

The Intel Extreme Masters are a product of the ESL. In 2006, when the Intel sponsored European tournament saw room for expansion outside of Europe, especially in North American markets, Intel provided funds for a worldwide tournament, billing it as the Intel Extreme Masters.  In 2007, when established, the IEM established a format of many smaller qualifying events, leading up to a large final event that is held at CeBIT. All of the Grand Finals have been held at CeBIT. Starting in 2008, the Tournament was billed as being worldwide, boasting participants from Europe, North America, and Asia.  Although Counterstrike 1.6 was the only game offered in the first season, the variety of games has increased greatly, to the four that were offered during Season 5. World of Warcraft was offered during Season 4, but was dropped for Season 5. The Season 5 Finals will be held at CeBIT and will included a  prize pool.

Games offered in Intel Extreme Masters: Counter-Strike (Seasons 1–6), Warcraft 3: Reign of Chaos and Warcraft 3: The Frozen Throne (Seasons 1–2, 3: Asian Championship Finals — CS1.6 and Asian Championship Finals — WoW, 4: Global Challenge Chengdu, 5: Global Challenge Shanghai), World of Warcraft (Seasons 2: Global Challenge Dreamhack, 3–4), Quake Live (Seasons 4–5), StarCraft II (Seasons 5–6), League of Legends (LoL) (Seasons 5: World Championship (LoL Invitational), 6)

IEM seasons

Season I
(Finals: 15–18 March 2007 at CeBIT 2007)
Counter-Strike: Poland's Team Pentagram
Warcraft III: France's Yoan "ToD" Merlo

Season II
(Finals: 6–9 March 2008 at CeBIT 2008)
Global Challenge Los Angeles:
Counter-Strike: Sweden's FnaticRC
Warcraft III: Korea's June "Lyn" Park
World Championship:
Counter-Strike: Germany's Mousesports
Warcraft III: Korea's June "Lyn" Park

Season III
(World Championship(Finals): 3–8 March 2009 at CeBIT 2009)
Global Challenge Games Convention:
World of Warcraft: Germany's Nihilum Plasma 
Global Challenge Los Angeles:
Counter-Strike: Sweden's SK Gaming
World of Warcraft: Spain's x6tence
Global Challenge Montreal:
Counter-Strike: Sweden's Fnatic
World of Warcraft: the UK's SK Gaming
Global Challenge Dubai:
Counter-Strike: Germany's Mousesports
Asian Championshiphttp: — WoW:
Counter-Strike: Korea's e-STRO
World of Warcraft: Korea's H O N
WarCraft III: the Netherlands's Manuel "Grubby" Schenkhuizen
European Championship:
Counter-Strike: Denmark's mTw
World of Warcraft: Bulgaria's iNNERFiRE
American Championship:
Counter-Strike: Brazil's Made in Brazil
World of Warcraft: the United States's Trade Chat
Asian Championship: CS1.6:
Counter-Strike: China's wNv Teamwork
WarCraft III: China's Li "Sky" Xiaofeng
World Championship:
Counter-Strike: Sweden's fnatic
World of Warcraft: Korea's H O N

Season IV
(World Championship(Finals): 2–6 March 2010 at CeBIT 2010)
Global Challenge Gamescom:
Counter-Strike: Germany's Mousesports
Quake Live: the United States's Shane "rapha" Hendrixson
World of Warcraft: the United Arab Emirates's Ensidia 
Global Challenge Chengdu:
Counter-Strike: Sweden's SK Gaming
DotA: China's For The Dream (ex-LGD)
Warcraft III: China's Lu "Fly100%" Weiliang
Global Challenge Dubai:
Counter-Strike: Sweden's Fnatic
Quake Live: the United States's Shane "rapha" Hendrixson
European Championship:
Counter-Strike: Germany's Mousesports
Quake Live: Belarus's Alexey "Cypher" Yanushevsky
World of Warcraft: Germany's SK Gaming Sansibar
American Championship:
Counter Strike: the United States's compLexity
Quake Live: the United States's Tim "DaHanG" Fogarty
World of Warcraft: the United States's compLexity Black
Asian Championship:
Counter Strike: Korea's WeMade FOX
Quake Live: China's Fan "Jibo" Zhibo
World of Warcraft: Korea's Button Bashers
World Championship:
Counter-Strike: Ukraine's Natus Vincere
Quake Live: the United States's Shane "rapha" Hendrixson
World of Warcraft: the United States's Evil Geniuses

Season V
(World Championship(Finals): 1–5 March 2011 at CeBIT 2011)
Global Challenge Shanghai:
Counter-Strike: Sweden's fnatic
Warcraft III: The Frozen Throne: Korea's June "Lyn" Park
DotA: China's: EHOME
Global Challenge Cologne:
StarCraft II: Sweden's Stefan "MorroW" Andersson — Mousesports
Quake Live: Germany's k1llsen
American Championship:
Counter Strike: Brazil's compLexity
Quake Live: the United States's Shane "rapha" Hendrixson
StarCraft II: Peru's Jian "Fenix" Morayra Alejo — fnatic
European Championship:
Counter-Strike: Sweden's fnatic
Quake Live: Russia's Anton "Cooller" Singov
StarCraft II: Sweden's Jeffrey "SjoW" Brusi — Team Dignitas
World Championship:
Counter-Strike: Ukraine's Natus Vincere
Quake Live: the United States's Shane "rapha" Hendrixson
StarCraft II: Korea's Jung "AcE" Woo-Seo — Team StarTale
LoL Invitational: Germany's myRevenge

Season VI
(World Championship(Finals): 6–10 March 2012 at CeBIT 2012)
Global Challenge Cologne:
LoL: the United States's Counter Logic Gaming
StarCraft II: Korea's Lee "PuMa" Ho-Joon — Evil Geniuses
Global Challenge Guangzhou:
LoL: China's World Elite
StarCraft II: the United States's Greg "IdrA" Fields — Evil Geniuses
Counter-Strike: Sweden's fnatic
Global Challenge New York City:
LoL: the European Union's fnatic
StarCraft II: Korea's Park "DongRaeGu" Soo-Ho — Complexity Gaming & Team MvP
Counter-Strike: Sweden's SK Gaming
Global Challenge Kyiv:
LoL: Russia's Moscow 5
StarCraft II: Korea's Moon "MMA" Sung-Won — Team SlayerS
Counter-Strike: Ukraine's Natus Vincere
Global Challenge São Paulo:
StarCraft II: Korea's Kim "viOLet" Dong-Hwan — Team Empire
World Championship:
LoL: Russia's Moscow 5
StarCraft II: Korea's Jang "MC" Min-Chul— SK Gaming
Counter-Strike: Poland's ESC Gaming

Season VII

Global Challenge Gamescom:
LoL: Russia's Moscow Five
StarCraft II: Korea's Jung "Mvp" Jong-Hyun — Incredible Miracle
Global Challenge Singapore(originally in Guangzhou):
LoL: the European Union's MeetYourMakers
StarCraft II: Korea's Ju "Sting" Hoon — Western Wolves
Global Challenge Cologne:
LoL: Korea's SK Telecom T1
Global Challenge Katowice:
LoL: Russia's Gambit Gaming (ex-M5)
StarCraft II: Korea's Kang "First" Hyun-Woo — Incredible Miracle
Global Challenge Brazil:
LoL: Korea's Incredible Miracle
World Championship:
LoL: Korea's CJ Entus Blaze
StarCraft II: Korea's Choi "YoDa" Byung-Hyun — Incredible Miracle

Season VIII

Season IX

Season X

Season XI

Season XII

Season XIII

Season XIV

Season XV

Season XVI

Season XVII

Season XVIII

Format 
IEM utilizes a fair number of offline qualifiers. During Season 5, qualifiers were held for North America, Europe, and Southeast Asia regions. Those who qualify for the finals are placed into two groups of six, of which the top two advance. The first place member of each group goes directly to the semifinals, and the second and third place members go into the quarterfinals.

Organisation 
The Intel Extreme Masters are run by the ESL which is owned by Turtle Entertainment GmbH. Turtle Entertainment is based in Cologne, Germany.

See also 
 ESL Pro League

References

External links 

 Official website (English)

 
2006 establishments in Germany
StarCraft competitions